Chien is a romanisation of multiple Chinese surnames and Chinese given names.

Given name
Angela Yu Chien (1942–2004), Hong Kong actress
Chien Yao (born 1961), Taiwanese lyricist
Chien Lee, American entrepreneur and sports team owner

Surname

Origins and statistics
As a surname, Chien is the Wade–Giles romanisation of a number of surnames spelled Jian in Hanyu Pinyin, as well as a variant spelling of surnames spelled Qian in Pinyin (Ch'ien in Wade Giles):

Additionally some bearers of this surname changed their surname to the Jiǎn described above, which is homophonous in Mandarin Chinese, though not in other varieties of Chinese.
Qián, literally meaning "money", also originated as an occupational surname, said to have been adopted by a holder of the post of treasurer during the Zhou Dynasty.
Qiān

Data compiled by Patrick Hanks on the basis of the 2011 United Kingdom census and the Census of Ireland 2011 found 49 people with the surname Chien on the island of Great Britain and none on the island of Ireland. The 1881 United Kingdom census found one person with the surname Chien. The 2010 United States Census found 3,756 people with the surname Chien, making it the 8,732nd-most-common name in the country. This represented an increase from 3,239 (9,257th-most-common) in the 2000 Census. In both censuses, more than nine-tenths of the bearers of the surname identified as Asian, and roughly three per cent as non-Hispanic white.

People

Entertainers
Lung Chien (1916–1975), Chinese film director
Chien Te-men (1943–2018), Taiwanese actor
Fernando Chien (born 1974), Taiwanese stunt performer
Jolin Chien (born 1986), Taiwanese singer
Dewi Chien (born 1992), Taiwanese actress

Politicians
Robert Chien (1929–2014), Taiwanese economist and politician
Frederick Chien (born 1935), Taiwanese diplomat
Chien Tai-lang (born 1947), Taiwanese politician
Chien Tung-ming (born 1951), Taiwanese politician
Eugene Chien (born 1946), Taiwanese politician and diplomat
Chien Hsi-chieh (born 1947), Taiwanese politician
Chien Chung-liang, Taiwanese politician

Scientists
Robert Tienwen Chien (1931–1983), American computer scientist 
Shu Chien (born 1931), American physiologist
Paul Chien (born 1947), American biologist

Sportspeople
Chien Kok-ching, Taiwanese baseball player
Chien Wei-chuan (born 1971), Taiwanese basketball player
Chien Yu-hsiu (born 1980), Taiwanese badminton player
Chien Yu-chin (born 1982), Taiwanese badminton player

Other
John C. T. Chien (1940–2013), Taiwanese Episcopalian bishop 
Raymond Chien (born 1952), Hong Kong businessman
Carl Chien (born 1964), Taiwanese businessman
Sansan Chien (1967–2011), Taiwanese composer
Chien Wen-pin (born 1971), Taiwanese conductor
Colleen V. Chien (born 1973), American law professor
Hank Chien (born 1974), American plastic surgeon who formerly held a world record score in the video game Donkey Kong
Chien Shan-hua, Taiwanese musicologist
Alec Chien, Hong Kong pianist
Catia Chien, Brazilian children's book illustrator

References

Multiple Chinese surnames